Feminism Unmodified: Discourses on Life and Law is a 1987 book by feminist legal scholar Catharine A. MacKinnon. The book is a collection of essays by MacKinnon delivered during the 1980s, in which she makes a radical feminist critique of pornography and liberal feminism.

References

Further reading
Katharine T. Bartlett, Review: MacKinnon's Feminism: Power on Whose Terms?, California Law Review, Vol. 75, No. 4 (Jul., 1987), pp. 1559-1570
Whitman, Christina "Law and Sex." Review of Feminism Unmodified, by C. A. MacKinnon. Mich. L. Rev. 86 (1988): 1388-403.
Finley, Lucinda (1988) The Nature of Domination and the Nature of Women:Reflections on Feminism Unmodified
Sustein, Cass (1988)  ''Feminism and Legal Theory - Review of Feminism Unmodified
Olsen, Frances (1989) 'Feminist Theory in Grand Style', Columbia Law Review, 89/5: 1147-1178 
Hein, Hilde (1987) In Search of Equality,  The Women's Review of Books, 5/1: 6-7

External links
Porn in the U.S.A., Part I Hard Cop, Soft Cop: Catharine MacKinnon and Andrea Dworkin on Pornography

1987 non-fiction books
Books by Catharine MacKinnon
English-language books
Feminist books
Harvard University Press books
Radical feminist books
Non-fiction books about pornography